Wales Comic Con (WCC; branded since 2019 as Wales Comic Con: Telford Takeover and as Wales Comic Con: Homecoming for August 2022) is a bi-annual fan convention in the United Kingdom, first held in Wrexham, North Wales in 2008, until the main event moved to Telford, England in December 2019, due to demands for a larger venue.

History and venue 

The event was founded in Wrexham, Wales in 2007, with the first convention held in 2008, with around 100–150 visitors. Started as an idea by Jaime Milner of North Wales-based events management company Mercury Promotions, it was first held as a one day a year event, until it was increased to two events a year and included some two-day events.

The event first took place in 2008 at the Plas Coch Sports Centre on Wrexham Glyndŵr University's Plas Coch campus, with 100–150 people. Although by 2013 the event later expanded to neighbouring buildings such as the William Aston Hall and Catrin Finch Centre, until the event covered large parts of the university campus. The event was locally awarded "Best Visitor Event" in the Wrexham Tourism Ambassador Awards.

The December 2017 one-day event attracted 8,000 visitors. The 2018 event was estimated to have 10,000 visitors.

In 2018, wrestler Mick Foley was pressured by Comic Con Scotland to cancel his appearance in Wrexham citing a "conflict" in Foley attending both events. Foley responded by cancelling his Edinburgh appearance and while maintaining his appearance in Wrexham.

In 2019, the event was stated by Wrexham County Borough Council to bring in more than £1 million to the regional economy.

Move to Telford

In May 2019, organisers announced that the convention would be moving to Telford's International Centre starting with the December 2019 convention, replacing Wrexham as the event's usual location due to demands for a larger venue. The convention would be branded as "Wales Comic Con: Telford Takeover" from the December event in Telford. The move met opposition in Wales, with Plaid Cymru councillors branding it a "disgrace", and Wrexham County Borough Council stating it was "very disappointed". Aside capacity restrictions, the venue in Wrexham was said to have parking issues, with parking overflowing and impacting nearby side streets. The venue attracts around 10,000 visitors, and the council described it to be bringing "exceptional economic benefits" to Wrexham. A councillor stated the move "emphasises the need for [...] better facilities [in Wrexham] [...] [and that] the Welsh Government and Wrexham Council should reflect on this failure". The same councillor also criticised the government's support for a centre (ICC Wales) in Newport and the lack of investment of an equivalent site in North Wales. Plaid Cymru MS Bethan Jenkins hoped a Welsh venue can be found for the event, but questioned that the event could not be called "Wales Comic Con" if held in England.

At the first event in Telford in December 2019, the event's move was welcomed by visitors attending, with a trader stating "it had outgrown Wrexham". Telford used to host a MCM Midlands Comic Con for over 10 years, until it was scrapped in November 2017.

The event on 25–26 April 2020 was moved to August 2020 due to the COVID-19 pandemic in the United Kingdom. It was later delayed again to 2021.

Partial return to Wrexham
On 26 June 2022, it was announced that the convention would host a one-day event in Wrexham, working with the university, Wrexham County Borough Council and the Welsh Government to liaise the return. The August event would be hosted alongside the Telford April and December events.

Convention features 
For the 2016 convention, the convention was set up as follows:

Photographs and Autographs 
Photograph sessions were held in either of the two main halls with a select few guests offering photographs on either day of the two-day event, costing £10–30 on the day. Autograph signing sessions were available in the main hall on both days, costing £10–25 for a signature each, and could be pre-ordered online as well as in-person. In 2019, Rupert Grint charged £125 each either a signature or photo, higher than many other guests attending.

Q&A panels 
Q&A panels were held on both days from 11.20 am to 5pm, in either the William Aston Hall (the event's "Hall A") or the Nick Whitehead Suite ("Hall B") at Glyndŵr University, and were included as part of a entry ticket. Guests may talk about their shows and behind-the-scenes at these panels.

Aftershow Party 
An aftershow party was held at The Centenary Club bar near the Racecourse Ground next to the university in 2016.

Gaming Zone 
A gaming zone (or gaming arena) was set up to allow visitors to bring retro gaming consoles to share with other visitors, with some dating 2–3 decades old. The zone also includes the latest gadgetry and games, and it described as "always packed". In Wrexham, this zone was held in a "Gaming Tent" on some occasions.

Cosplay 
Cosplay is visible throughout the event, with parades, competitions and some photo opportunities available to those who participate in cosplay. Including a "Best Craftmanship" award at later events.

Cosplay Masquerade 
A cosplay masquerade is held at some events, allowing visitors to have photographs taken with various cosplay artists and props portraying known cultural icons and franchises.

Stalls 
Stalls displaying various licensed and video game memorabilia and merchandise, as well as collectables and artwork were set up for viewing and sale. Various video game, comic, art, action figure, photography, collectable, and gift traders participate in the event.

Robot combat (Wrexham 2022) 
For the 2022 Wrexham event, a robot combat event would take place at the convention, based on Robot Wars.

Location, dates and notable guests

See also 

 List of comic book conventions
 Comic book convention
 List of multigenre conventions

Notes

References

External links 

Multigenre conventions
Science fiction conventions in the United Kingdom
Recurring events established in 2008
Comics conventions
Fan conventions
British fan conventions
Events in Wales